Lovemore Matombo  (died January 27, 2020) was the President of the Zimbabwe Congress of Trade Unions (ZCTU).

Police arrested Matombo in March 2007 for allegedly assaulting his daughter-in-law, Mary-Ane Nyathi, on February 11. Magistrate Robson Finsin of Harare Magistrates' Court found him innocent on June 29, 2007 on the grounds that there were a lack of witnesses. His lawyers, Alec Muchadehama and Andrew Makoni, defended him in the case. One of the two witnesses in the incident, security guard Tangirai Mukondo, admitted police had coached him on what to say in court.

Nyathi is still pursuing the case in civil court.

On May 8, 2008, Matombo and ZCTU Secretary-General Wellington Chibebe were arrested for allegedly inciting rebellion when speaking at a rally on May Day. They were released on bail on May 19 by Judge Ben Hlatshwayo. Hlatshwayo ordered that they "not address any political gatherings" until the conclusion of their case, along with other restrictions.

References

2020 deaths
Year of birth missing
Zimbabwean politicians
Place of birth missing
Place of death missing